Thaneek Pura is a hill station village (hamlet) in Chintpurni in the Una district of the state of Himachal Pradesh in India.  It is situated near the Chintpurni Shakti Peeth Temple, which is a place of pilgrimage for Hindus. The area is surrounded by the western Himalaya in the north and east in the smaller Shiwalik (or Shivalik) range bordering the state of Punjab.

Description 

Thaneek Pura is situated at a distance of about 3 km from the Chintpurni Shakti Peeth Shrine. Apart from its scenic beauty, Thaneek Pura is famous for its temples like Guga Zahar veer Temple, Radha-Krishna Temple, Mahiya Sidh Temple. It is a beautiful place for nature walk. Thaneek Pura also has one Government Primary School.

Here, people can also see an ancient and unique deep well that digs down around 60 stairs and main well being further down. Thaneek Pura is also famous for a fair which is an annual event starting on the subsequent day of Krishna Janamashtmi and coincides with Guga Navami celebrations.

A grand Yajna and Bhandaara is also organized which is one of the largest of its kind. A very famous wrestling competition is also a part of this fair that is attended by all the famous wrestlers of Himachal, Punjab and other nearby states. This fair continues for three days.

Attractions 

There is a lot to see and do in Thaneek Pura:

Temples
Radha Krishna Temple
Guga Zahar Veer Temple
Mahiya Sidh Temple
Baba Balak Naath Temple

Structures
Ancient Heritage Deep Well (Bada Khoo)

Bazaar
Chaat Bazaar-Eat nice food and buy handicrafts.

Activities
Forest Camping
Nature Walk and Trekking

Events
Krishna Janamashtami Festival: Celebrated in the Radha Krishna Temple (August/September), it is a big event on the occasion of the birthday of Lord Krishna.
Guga Navami: Celebrated in the Guga Zahar Peer Temple (August/September), it is also a huge event, which is followed by a three-day annual fair, a Grand Yajna, wrestling competitions, and much more. This event falls on the very next day of Krishna Janamashtmi.
Shivratri: Shivratri is also celebrated with great festivities here in the Shivalya of the Radha Krishna temple (February/March). Special bhandara is organized where very exclusive food is distributed.
Other festivals include Lohri, Baisakhi, Diwali, and Dushehra, etc.

Gugga Temple

The Gugga temple of Gogaji is a very elegant temple in Thaneek Pura. The legend is that Gugga ji was son of mother Bachhal and disciple of Guru Gorakhnath. He originated from Guggal (a special type of Dhoop) as a result of Guru Gorakhnath’s blessings.

He suffered the conspiracy of step brothers (twins, known as Jodu), which ultimately led him to murder his twin brothers. Gugga Rana killed Nags (Snakes) when they came to help them. He was very brave and his blue horse was quite loyal. His sister Gugdi supported him at every step. But when he killed his step twin brothers his mother got hurt and out of anger asked him to leave the kingdom. Gugga ji respected his mother’s words and left forever. He was never seen again by any body.

During the rainy season many fairs are held across the region and common belief is that Gugga worshiping provides protection from Snakes. 
The tale of Gugga is recited, from Raksha Bandhan to Gugga Naumi, by the followers who visit every house in the region. These followers while singing the tales of Gugga Ji carry a Chhat (a wooden umbrella) and people offer them grains and other stuff. They bring all the collected offerings to the temple and then the grand festival of Gugga Navami is celebrated for three days.

Apart from various pujas and rituals, the wrestling competition (Maali or Dangal) is organized for three days where  participants from all over the region and compete. The annual three-day fair is also a part of these festivities where people come and enjoy great food, and shop for decorative items, handicrafts, clothes, cosmetics, household goods, and toys for children.

Location

Thaneek Pura is situated at the altitude of around 950 meters and is part of the Una district, Himachal Pradesh. It is near  Bharwain, located on the Hoshiarpur-Dharmashala road. This road is part of the State Highway network.

Weather

Spring : About mid-February to mid-April. The winter starts losing its bite around mid-February.

Summer : Mid-April to end of June. It is hot in summer and light cottons are recommended.

Rainy season : July - September. Still quite warm and, of course, humid. Very rainy.

Autumn : October - November. Days are pleasantly warm, nights are cool. May need light woollens at night or early mornings.

Winter: December - January. It is quite pleasant during the day and you may get by with one layer of woollens. The winter nights are cold and an extra layer of woollens is required.

In general, temperatures in Thaneek Pura, Chintpurni are about 5-8 Celsius lower than in the Punjab and Haryana plains and in Delhi.

References

External links
 Thaneek Pura
 Chintpurni

Villages in Una district
Tourism in Himachal Pradesh